Sholto Douglas was the mythical progenitor of the Scottish Clan Douglas.

Sholto Douglas may also refer to:

 Sholto Douglas, 15th Earl of Morton (1732–1774), Scottish nobleman and peer
 Sholto Douglas (naval officer), (1833–1913) Admiral in the Royal Navy
 Sholto Douglas, 19th Earl of Morton (1844–1935), Scottish landowner, businessman and representative peer
 Sholto Johnstone Douglas (1871–1958), Scottish artist
 Sholto Douglas (cricketer) (1873–1916), English cricketer
 Sholto Douglas, 1st Baron Douglas of Kirtleside (1893–1969), Marshal of the Royal Air Force
 Sholto Douglas (fencer), Australian fencer